Route 670 is a  long mostly north–south secondary highway in the southwestern portion of New Brunswick, Canada. Most of the route is in New Maryland Parish.

The route starts at Route 10 in Albrights Corner, where it travels south through a mostly forested area past Ripples. It then travels southwest through Randall Corner where it turns southeast and follows the east bank of French Lake before ending at Lakeville Corner at Route 690.

History

See also

References

670
670